The Heirline Covered Bridge is a historic wooden covered bridge located at Harrison Township and Napier Township in Bedford County, Pennsylvania. It crosses the Juniata River. It is one of 15 historic covered bridges in Bedford County.

It was listed on the National Register of Historic Places in 1980.

References 

Covered bridges on the National Register of Historic Places in Pennsylvania
Covered bridges in Bedford County, Pennsylvania
Bridges completed in 1902
Wooden bridges in Pennsylvania
Bridges in Bedford County, Pennsylvania
National Register of Historic Places in Bedford County, Pennsylvania
Road bridges on the National Register of Historic Places in Pennsylvania
Burr Truss bridges in the United States